Miharu may refer to:

 Miharu (given name), a feminine Japanese given name
 Miharu Dam
 Miharu Domain, a Japanese domain of the Edo period, located in Mutsu Province
 Miharu, Fukushima, a town located in Tamura District, Fukushima, Japan
 Miharu Station
 Miharu Takizakura, an ancient cherry tree in Miharu, Fukushima, in northern Japan